Rokhan Barakzai or Rokan Barekzai (born 1 January 1989) is an Afghan cricketer. He made his Twenty20 International (T20I) debut on 28 November 2015 against Hong Kong. He made his One Day International (ODI) debut on 29 December 2015 against Zimbabwe. Barekzai was named as the best bowler of the 2014 Shpageeza T20 Cricket Tournament. He made his first-class debut for Band-e-Amir Region in the 2017–18 Ahmad Shah Abdali 4-day Tournament on 20 October 2017.

References

External links
 
 

1989 births
Living people
Afghan cricketers
Afghanistan One Day International cricketers
Afghanistan Twenty20 International cricketers
People from Nangarhar Province
Band-e-Amir Dragons cricketers
Boost Defenders cricketers